The 75th District of the Iowa House of Representatives in the state of Iowa.

Current elected officials
Thomas Gerhold is the representative currently representing the district.

Past representatives
The district has previously been represented by:
 Edgar H. Holden, 1971–1973
 David M. Stanley, 1973–1975
 Otto H. Nealson, 1975–1977
 Betty Hoffmann-Bright, 1977–1983
 Ward Handorf, 1983–1987
 Jane Svoboda, 1987–1993
 Janet Metcalf, 1993–2003
 Danny Carroll, 2003–2007
 Eric Palmer, 2007–2011
 Guy Vander Linden, 2011–2013
 Dawn Pettengill, 2013–2019
 Thomas Gerhold, 2019–present

References

075